Setefano Cakau (born November 3, 1978) is a Fiji Rugby union player. He plays for Prisons club in the BP Oil sevens series competition which is one of the biggest sporting events in Fiji, similar to the IRB Sevens World Series, and has also been included in the Fiji Sevens team.

In the Fifteens version of the game, he plays as a Flanker and has represented Namosi several times in the Digicel Cup and he also plays for the Coastal Stallions in the Colonial Cup.

Cakau turned out for Jaffna Challengers in Sri Lanka's Carlton Sevens Tournament in 2012.

He currently turns out for Navy Sports Club in the Sri Lankan Premier Rugby League whose team is captained by Yoshitha Rajapakse the Sri Lankan Rugby Captain and son of the Sri Lankan President. He is playing his trade in Sri Lanka as a first inside Centre and his combination with fellow Fijian Taniela Rawaqa has made the side a strong force.

Career highlights
Fiji Sevens 2003–present
Prisons club 2002, 2007
IRB Sevens World Series - 2003, 2006, 2007, 2008
Jaffna Challengers, Sri Lanka Carlton Sevens Champions 2012

References
 Fiji Rugby website
 Teivovo website

1978 births
Living people
People from Rewa Province
Fijian soldiers
Fijian rugby union players
Rugby union flankers
Male rugby sevens players
Fijian expatriate rugby union players
Expatriate rugby union players in Sri Lanka
Fijian expatriate sportspeople in Sri Lanka
I-Taukei Fijian people